The fortune jack (Seriola peruana), also known as the darkfin amberjack, is a species of ray-finned fish from the family Carangidae. It is found in the eastern Pacific from Mexico to Ecuador and on the Galapagos Islands. This species was formally described by the Austrian ichthyologist Franz Steindachner (1834-1919) in 1881 with the type locality given as Callao in Peru.

References

Fortune jack
Fish described in 1881